Social banditry or social crime is a form of social resistance involving behavior that by law is illegal but is supported by wider "oppressed" society as moral and acceptable. The term "social bandit" was invented by the Marxist historian Eric Hobsbawm and introduced in his books Primitive Rebels (1959) and Bandits (1969). Hobsbawm characterized social banditry as a primitive form of class struggle and class resistance in usually pre-industrial and frontier societies. Social banditry is a widespread phenomenon that has occurred in many societies throughout recorded history, and forms of social banditry still exist, as evidenced by piracy and organized crime syndicates. Later social scientists have also discussed the term's applicability to more modern forms of crime, like street gangs and the economy associated with the trade in illegal drugs.

Eric Hobsbawm

Hobsbawm's key thesis was that outlaws were individuals living on the edges of rural societies by robbing and plundering, who are often seen by ordinary people as heroes or beacons of popular resistance. He called it a form of "pre-historic social movement", by contrast with the organized labour movement. Hobsbawm's book discusses the bandit as a symbol, and mediated idea, and some of the outlaws he refers to are Pancho Villa, Lampião, Ned Kelly, Dick Turpin, Juraj Jánošík, Sándor Rózsa, Billy the Kid, and Carmine Crocco, among others. The colloquial sense of an outlaw as bandit or brigand is the subject of the following passage by Hobsbawm: 
The point about social bandits is that they are peasant outlaws whom the lord and state regard as criminals, but who remain within peasant society, and are considered by their people as heroes, as champions, avengers, fighters for justice, perhaps even leaders of liberation, and in any case as men to be admired, helped and supported. This relation between the ordinary peasant and the rebel, outlaw and robber is what makes social banditry interesting and significant ... Social banditry of this kind is one of the most universal social phenomena known to history.

Criticism
Historians and anthropologists such as John S. Koliopoulos and Paul Sant Cassia have criticised the social bandit theory, emphasising the frequent use of bandits as armatoloi by Ottoman authorities in suppressing the peasantry in defence of the central state. Sant Cassia observed of Mediterranean bandits that they "are often romanticized afterward through nationalistic rhetoric and texts which circulate and have a life of their own, giving them a permanence and potency which transcends their localized domain and transitory nature". In Hobsbawm's case, the romanticisation was political rather than nationalistic, yet the fluid, ambiguous figure of the bandit remains.

Historic examples
Robin Hood
Brigandage in the Two Sicilies, peasant rebellion developed in southern Italy in the early 19th century
Sardinian banditry
Dacoity, Indian bandits who portrayed themselves (and were portrayed by the media) as social bandits
Expropriative anarchism, practice of robbery and scams in Argentina and Spain 
Cangaço, social banditry in Northeast Region, Brazil 
Hajduk, outlaws in Central and Eastern Europe
Betyárs, social bandits in Kingdom of Hungary
Klepht, anti-Ottoman insurgents in Greece and Cyprus
Narcocorrido, Mexican music from the norteño folk corrido tradition
Rapparee, Irish guerrillas during the 1690s Williamite war
Uskoks, Croatian Habsburg soldiers during the Ottoman wars in Europe
Abrek, Anti-Cossack/Russian guerilla raiders in the North Caucasus, especially Chechnya

See also
Culture of honor
Illegalism

References

Further reading
Benedetto Croce, Angelillo (Angelo Duca). Capo di banditi, 1892
 
 
 

Protest tactics
Secret societies related to organized crime